The KHSAA Commonwealth Gridiron Bowl is a series of football games, typically held on the first weekend of December, that determine the high school champions of the U.S. state of Kentucky. The tournaments that lead to the championship games, as well as regular-season competition, are governed by the Kentucky High School Athletic Association (KHSAA).

History
The KHSAA began conducting state football championships in 1959. Throughout its history, the competition has been divided into classes based on enrollment (though with historic exceptions noted below). The history of classifications is as follows:
 1959–1974: Three-class system. All schools in Jefferson County, which includes (and is now consolidated with) the state's largest city of Louisville, were placed in Class 3A regardless of enrollment. Remaining schools were placed in Class 2A or A based on enrollment.
 1975–1986: Quasi-four-class system. Initially, all high schools in Jefferson County were placed in Class 4A regardless of enrollment, though by the end of this era smaller schools began to be placed in their appropriate enrollment classes. In this era, there were two separate 4A champions—a "State 4A" winner from outside Jefferson County and a "Jefferson County 4A" champion—that would meet for an overall 4A title.
 1987–2006: True four-class system, with all Jefferson County schools classified according to their enrollment.
 2007–present: Six-class system, again based on enrollment, but with a slight change in calculation of enrollment. Historically, schools were classified based on total enrollment in grades 9 to 12, with all-boys schools treated as having twice their actual enrollment. With the expansion to six classes, the KHSAA changed the basis for classification to enrollment of boys only in the same grades.

Traditionally, the championship games were held in Louisville, first at the former Cardinal Stadium on the grounds of the Kentucky Exposition Center and later at the current Cardinal Stadium (previously known as Papa John's Cardinal Stadium) on the campus of the University of Louisville. From 2009–2016, the games moved to Houchens Industries–L. T. Smith Stadium on the campus of Western Kentucky University in Bowling Green. In 2017, the KHSAA announced that the 2017 and 2018 games will be played at Kroger Field on the campus of the University of Kentucky in Lexington. With the expansion to six classes, the Gridiron Bowl is now a two-day affair, with three championship games on Friday and three on Saturday.

List of Champions
Below is a complete list of State Champions from all six of the KHSAA Divisions

6A State Champions

5A State Champions

4A State Champions

3A State Champions

2A State Champions

1A State Champions

Championships, by schools
The following is a list of all schools that have won at least one KHSAA Commonwealth Gridiron Bowl Championship, along with what years they have won their championship(s).

Notes

Consolidated into McCracken County High School as Mustangs on August 9, 2013.
Tilghman did not participate in the McCracken County High consolidation, as it is operated by a separate district.
School is now defunct

References
Past KHSAA Football Champions

External links
http://www.khsaa.org/football/

High school football in Kentucky